Kirkland College was a small, private liberal arts women's college located in Clinton, New York, from 1968 to 1978. It was named for Samuel Kirkland, who founded Hamilton College. Hamilton absorbed Kirkland on June 30, 1978, and now maintains its archives and financial endowment, and supports its alumnae community.

History

Planning for Kirkland began during the 1962-1963 academic year through the influence of then-Hamilton College president Robert W. McEwen.  It was named after the nearby town of Kirkland, in turn named for Samuel Kirkland, the founder of Hamilton.  Hamilton was a men's college. Kirkland College, a college for women, was envisioned as the first of several institutions which would form a cluster similar to the Claremont Colleges.  Though the "cluster" vision was never achieved, two factors led to a more innovative and experimental nature at Kirkland: first, the introduction of progressive views of undergraduate education on the part of Millicent Carey McIntosh, former President of Barnard College, who came on as a member of the first Board of Trustees, and second, the mandate to "make a fresh attack on introducing major fields of learning" without being constrained by the more traditional patterns at Hamilton – a mandate embraced by Kirkland's president, Samuel F. Babbitt.  The untimely passing of Hamilton President McEwen, also a member of the first Kirkland Board, led to the more independent development of the new institution.

Kirkland opened in 1968 on its own campus, adjacent to Hamilton College. The Kirkland faculty and students operated in a more diverse and transparent community than had been the norm at Hamilton, and, although the new college got off to an exciting start,  the many differences in educational and community functioning inevitably led to small and large conflicts between the two institutions. Meantime, the economic climate, which had been very positive during the planning stages for Kirkland, began to deteriorate. As a result, the debt service accruing to build Kirkland's entirely new campus exerted a tremendous burden on its finances. Construction costs in one year increased by 10%. Planning a large endowment fundraising effort ("The Campaign for the Second Decade") Kirkland turned to Hamilton for a guarantee of potential loss of annual funds. In 1977, with the planned resignation of President Babbitt, Hamilton refused such assistance, and the two colleges were merged under protest  into a single, coeducational Hamilton in 1978.

A study and consideration in the form of an 'intimate history' by Samuel Fisher Babbitt, Kirkland's only president – Limited Engagement: Kirkland College 1965-1978, An Intimate History of the Rise and Fall of a Coordinate College for Women – provides an in-depth, first-person account of Kirkland's brief existence.  In addition to personal records and recollection, Babbitt was able to employ archival materials housed in the Hamilton College and Columbia University libraries. Despite its dissolution, Kirkland College, through faculty who remained to teach at Hamilton, and through the active influence of its graduates and former trustees, has had a profound influence on the surviving coeducational institution. One wag has commented: "Kirkland lost the battle, but they won the war".

Legacy at Hamilton College
When Kirkland was officially incorporated into and absorbed by Hamilton College in 1978, many continuing students elected to join the new co-ed college, and some faculty accepted equivalent positions in Hamilton's departments.  Yet discontent with the way the merger was executed festered long after 1978, coloring alumnae relations, inter-faculty relations and, to some degree, campus social dynamics. Despite such friction, many of the educational principles of Kirkland (such as student-designed majors and independent study) found their way into the Hamilton curriculum. Efforts on the part of both Kirkland and Hamilton alumni to acknowledge common interests have begun to mend these breaches by responding to the curiosity and interests of current Hamilton students regarding Kirkland and its influence on their college.

Endowment
Upon the dissolution of Kirkland, its endowment was transferred to the Hamilton endowment, with existing restrictions intact, with the understanding that all funds were to be applied "to support women and their needs and interests at Hamilton."  One on-going Hamilton program that received early support from the Kirkland Endowment is HAVOC (Hamilton Association for Volunteering, Outreach and Charity).)

Memorabilia and traditions
The Kirkland Archives are housed in the Burke Library at Hamilton College.  In 2007 a display case, containing a rotating exhibit of items from the Archives, was installed in the lobby of McEwen Hall, near an iconic sculpture, the "rock swing" that dates from Kirkland's early years.

The central motif of the Kirkland College seal was an apple tree, and green apples remain a symbol of Kirkland among its alumnae and supporters to this day.  During commencement exercises at Hamilton many students and faculty choose to wear a green apple pin on their academic robes to honor Kirkland's legacy.  Many graduating seniors also place green apples on the podium prior to receiving their diplomas.

The Hamilton College Bookstore sells various Kirkland merchandise, typically available on campus during June reunions.

The Kirkland Project
In the mid-1990s, a group of Hamilton faculty initiated a project with the intention of working "toward establishing a research center like the Bunting Institute at Harvard and the Pembroke Center at Brown."

The Kirkland Project is named in honor of Kirkland College, building on Kirkland's twin legacies of women's education and innovative pedagogy, expanding on them to meet the global challenges that face contemporary male and female students, faculty and staff.

Notable alumnae
 Christie Vilsack, a member of the Kirkland College Charter Class 1972, was the First Lady of Iowa.
 Joanne Rappaport is Professor of Anthropology at Georgetown University.
 Esther Barazzone, a former Kirkland faculty member, is now president of Chatham College in Pittsburgh, Pennsylvania.
 Roz Chast, cartoonist for The New Yorker, attended Kirkland College.
 Donna O. Kerner, is chairman of Anthropology at Wheaton College in Massachusetts.
 Natalie Babbitt, noted children's author, taught at Kirkland.  She was married to Pres. Samuel F. Babbitt, and wrote her first works while raising their children in Clinton, NY.
 Broadway actress Sandy Faison was a member of the Charter Class at Kirkland College, graduating in 1972.
 Patricia Goldsmith is Vice President of Institutional Advancement at Scripps College.
 M. Ellen Mitchell, class of 1975, is Professor of Psychology and was Director/Dean for 18 years at Illinois Institute of Technology in Chicago
 Helen Barolini writer, editor and translator who taught at Kirkland College.

See also
List of current and historical women's universities and colleges

References

External links
The Kirkland Project for the Study of Gender, Society and Culture
Hamilton College
Kirkland Alumnae site at Hamilton College
Kirkland Interactive Archives

Defunct private universities and colleges in New York (state)
Liberal arts colleges in New York (state)
Hamilton College (New York)
Embedded educational institutions
Educational institutions established in 1968
Educational institutions disestablished in 1978
Universities and colleges in Oneida County, New York
Clinton (village), New York